A list of the published works of Ian Frazier, American writer.

Books

Humor

Non-fiction

Translations

Essays and reporting
 
 
 
 
 
 
 
 
  Russian TV host Ivan Urgant.
  Hurricane Sandy and Staten Island.
 
 
 
 
 
 
  Salt stockpiles, Staten Island.
 
 
 
 
 
 
 
 
 
 
 
 
 
 
 
  Marina Litvinenko.
 
 
 
 
 
 
 }

Poems

Notes

Bibliographies by writer
Bibliographies of American writers